Matthew Barber (born 26 March 1983) is an English actor.

Early life and education
Born in Hammersmith, London, he grew up in Hampshire, training classically as a chorister at Winchester Cathedral before receiving academic and music scholarships to Bradfield College, where he was head boy.

Barber read Classical Studies and Philosophy at St Cuthbert's Society, Durham, graduating in 2005.

He trained as an actor at the Bristol Old Vic Theatre School graduating in 2007.

Career
He is best known for his role as Atticus Aldridge in Downton Abbey. Previous roles include Freddie Eynsford-Hill in Peter Hall's Pygmalion opposite Michelle Dockery at the Old Vic and internationally and Lysander in Jonathan Kent's The Fairy-Queen at Glyndebourne.

In 2011, he acted in Edward II, as the main character. Stet Journal said:  "Barber is an excellent Edward – naive, excitable, and ultimately pitiable... mesmerising"

Filmography

Theatre

References

External links 
 

1983 births
21st-century English male actors
Alumni of Bristol Old Vic Theatre School
English male film actors
English male musical theatre actors
English male stage actors
English male television actors
Living people
People educated at Bradfield College
People from Hammersmith
Male actors from London
Alumni of St Cuthbert's Society, Durham